Pause for a Hoarse Horse is the debut album of British rock band Home. The record was released in 1971 by CBS Records. The band's line-up consisted of Cliff Williams on bass, Laurie Wisefield on guitar, Mick Cook on drums and Mick Stubbs on guitar. It also featured keyboardist Clive John. The album did not make much headway and was one of only three albums released by the group from 1971 to 1973.

Track listing
All songs written by Mick Stubbs, except where noted.
"Tramp" – 3:30
"Family" – 4:30
"Pause for a Hoarse Horse" – 3:00
"Red E. Lewis and the Red Caps" – 4:30
"In My Time" – 4:15 (Cliff Williams, Laurie Wisefield, Mick Cook, Mick Stubbs)
"How Would It Feel" – 3:25
"Bad Days" – 4:10
"Mother" – 4:05
"Moses" – 5:10
"Welwyn Garden City Blues" – 1:30 (Wisefield, Stubbs)
"You're No Good" – 3:00

Personnel
 Mick Stubbs – lead guitar, 12-string guitar, lead vocals
 Laurie Wisefield – lead electric guitar, vocals
 Clive John – keyboards, Mellotron 
 Cliff Williams – bass guitar, vocals
 Mick Cook – drums, percussion, vocals
 Johnny "Willie" Weider – violin
Technical
 Bill Shepherd – executive producer
 Mike O'Mahoney - front cover photography

References

External links 
 
 
 

1971 debut albums
CBS Records albums